Aprilov Point (Aprilov Nos \a-'pri-lov 'nos\) is a point on the north coast of Greenwich Island, Antarctica situated 6.9 km east of Duff Point, 2.1 km east-southeast of Kabile Island, 2.2 km east-northeast of Crutch Peaks, 1.8 km south of Ongley Island, 5.5 km west of Agüedo Point, and 2.3 km north-northwest of Sevtopolis Peak.  Forming the east side of the entrance to Haskovo Cove and the west side of the entrance to Skaptopara Cove.

Named after the prominent Bulgarian educator Vasil Aprilov (1789-1847).

Location

British mapping in 1968, and Bulgarian in 2005 and 2009.

Maps
 L.L. Ivanov et al. Antarctica: Livingston Island and Greenwich Island, South Shetland Islands. Scale 1:100000 topographic map. Sofia: Antarctic Place-names Commission of Bulgaria, 2005.
 L.L. Ivanov. Antarctica: Livingston Island and Greenwich, Robert, Snow and Smith Islands. Scale 1:120000 topographic map.  Troyan: Manfred Wörner Foundation, 2009.

References
Aprilov Point. SCAR Composite Gazetteer of Antarctica.
 Bulgarian Antarctic Gazetteer. Antarctic Place-names Commission. (details in Bulgarian, basic data in English)

External links
 Aprilov Point. Copernix satellite image

Headlands of Greenwich Island
Bulgaria and the Antarctic